The 1925 Ole Miss Rebels football team was an American football team that represented the University of Mississippi as a member of the Southern Conference during its 1925 season. The team compiled a 5–5 record (0–4 against conference opponents), tied for last place in the conference, and outscored opponents by a total of 147 to 87.  In February 1925, Homer Hazel signed to become the head football coach at Ole Miss.

Four Ole Miss players were selected by the Daily Clarion-Ledger as first-team players on its 1925 All-Mississippi football team: Mitchell Salloum at left tackle; V. K. Smith at left guard; Ap Applewhite at right end; and Sollie Cohen at fullback. Quarterback Dick Cook and left halfback Van Martin were named to the second team. Other key players included Webb Burke at center.

Schedule

References

Ole Miss
Ole Miss Rebels football seasons
Ole Miss Rebels football